"I'm Not Perfect (But I'm Perfect for You)" is a song by Jamaican singer and songwriter Grace Jones, released as the first single from her eight album, Inside Story (1986). It was co-written by Bruce Woolley and produced by Nile Rodgers of Chic fame. For the 12" single release, "I'm Not Perfect" was remixed by Larry Levan and The Latin Rascals. The track met with commercial success, becoming one of Jones' biggest hits. It made the top 40 in several European countries and top 10 in New Zealand, and was the highest-charting single by Grace Jones on the US Billboard Hot 100, peaking at number 69, and her last song to enter this chart.

Music video
The accompanying music video for "I'm Not Perfect (But I'm Perfect for You)" was directed by Jones herself, and was the only video she directed, and it had a total budget of $1.25 million. For the video, Jones wore body paint and outfits, including a huge black and white skirt, that were designed by artist and the assistant director, Keith Haring. The video boasts cameo appearances from several of Jones' friends, including Andy Warhol (months before he died), record producer Nile Rodgers and fashion designer Tina Chow. 

Haring also himself appears in the video, captured when painting black patterns on a white 60-feet skirt that Jones wears while standing on a platform.

Jones stated in her 2015 book I'll Never Write My Memoirs that Capitol were "unconvinced" that she was competent enough to direct a music video, and that because the experience was so difficult—"not the directing itself but working with Capitol"—she vowed never to direct another video. She claims that because she was in every shot, she had to have her makeup frequently reapplied in an adjacent room, and upon returning to the studio, "they [Capitol] would be shooting something or having the cast change clothes. I would say 'What's going on? I am the director. I know what I am doing.'" Capitol also cut down the production time of the video to just two days despite Jones' request for more time.

Track listing
7" single
A. "I'm Not Perfect (But I'm Perfect for You)" – 3:22
B. "Scary But Fun" – 3:55

12" single
A. "I'm Not Perfect (But I'm Perfect for You)" (The Perfectly Extended Remix) – 5:54
B1. "I'm Not Perfect (But I'm Perfect for You)" (instrumental version) – 4:58
B2. "Scary But Fun" – 3:55

12" US single
A1. "I'm Not Perfect (But I'm Perfect for You)" (The Perfectly Extended Remix) – 5:54
A2. "I'm Not Perfect (But I'm Perfect for You)" (The Right on Time Edit) – 6:55
B1. "I'm Not Perfect (But I'm Perfect for You)" (The Ultra Perfect Edit) – 7:15
B2. "I'm Not Perfect (But I'm Perfect for You)" (The Ultra Perfect Dub) – 5:23
B3. "Scary But Fun" – 3:55

Charts

References

1986 singles
Grace Jones songs
Song recordings produced by Nile Rodgers
Songs written by Bruce Woolley
Songs written by Grace Jones
Manhattan Records singles
1986 songs
Freestyle music songs